USS Develin (AMc-45) was an Accentor-class coastal minesweeper acquired by the U.S. Navy for the dangerous task of removing mines from minefields laid in the water to prevent ships from passing.

Develin was launched by the Gibbs Gas Engine Co., Jacksonville, Florida, on 10 April 1941.

World War II service 

She was placed in service on 9 July 1941 and served in the 8th Naval District and the Potomac River Naval Command.

Post-war deactivation 

She was removed from the Navy List on 31 July 1946.

References

External links 
 Dictionary of American Naval Fighting Ships
 NavSource Online: Mine Warfare Vessel Photo Archive - Develin (AMc 45)

Accentor-class minesweepers
World War II minesweepers of the United States
Ships built in Jacksonville, Florida
1941 ships